Geretsried is a town in the district Bad Tölz-Wolfratshausen, located in Bavaria, Germany. The town is the most populated town in the district, with 23,219 inhabitants as of 31 December 2012.

The town is the site of a geothermal energy project using a novel closed-loop system that offers more environmental protection than conventional geothermal technologies. The project is a partnership between Eavor Technologies and Deep Energy Capital to produce sustainable zero carbon energy in Germany.

History
Geretsried was first mentioned in the year 1083. In the early years it served a little more than a group of farms along the postal route between Munich and Innsbruck. It belonged to the city of Wolfratshausen.

In 1937 two munitions factories were built: "Dynamit Aktien Gesellschaft" and "Deutsche Sprengchemie" in the boroughs of what is today Gartenberg and Stein. Towards the end of the war, these factories employed slave and foreign labourers. Today, the remains of storage bunkers, administrative buildings, and other remains are scattered throughout the town. In May 1945 the American air force bombed the factories.

In 1946, the empty bunkers and buildings were used to house German refugees from former ethnic German areas in Eastern Europe. In 1949, the citizens began to organize themselves and on April 1, 1950 the community of Geretsried came into being. On June 27, 1970, Geretsried got city rights.

Gallery

Geography
Geretsried lies on the Isar River and includes the communities of Gartenberg, Gelting, and Stein. The Bundestrasse (federal highway) 11 runs by the city. The distance to Munich is approximately 35 kilometers.

Politics

The town's Mayor is Mr. Michael Müller. On 30 March 2014, he was elected as Mayor of Geretsried town. He was re-elected in March 2020.

Coat of arms

The cogwheel in the coat of arms symbolizes the local industry, the river symbolizes the Isar and the Conifer symbolizes the nature.

Transport

The town belongs to the Munich public transportation zone. Regional buses connect the town to Wolfratshausen and Bad Tölz. An extension of the Munich S-Bahn line S7 is planned from Wolfratshausen to Geretsried.

Twin towns – sister cities

Geretsried is twinned with:
 Chamalières, France

Notable people
Edmund Nick (1891–1974), composer, conductor and music writer

References

External links

 Geretsried website

Bad Tölz-Wolfratshausen